Trail of Terror is a 1935 American Western film starring Bob Steele. It was done for Supreme Pictures and was produced by A. W. Hackel.

References

External links

1935 films
American Western (genre) films
American black-and-white films
1930s English-language films
1930s American films